The Pluton missile was a French nuclear-armed tactical ballistic missile (short-range ballistic missile, SRBM) system launched from a transporter erector launcher (TEL) platform mounted on an AMX-30 tank chassis. It was designed to provide the tactical part of French nuclear deterrence during the Cold War.

Development 
The Pluton came in replacement of the U.S.-built Honest John missile. This short range only allowed strikes on targets in West Germany or within France itself, which led to the development of the longer ranged Hadès missile.

The system was relatively light-weight, which allowed its deployment in difficult conditions. A CT-20 drone was available to provide last-minute information about the target before launch, making the Pluton system battle-capable.

A project for an updated version, called Super-Pluton, was dropped in favour of the Hadès project, and the aging Pluton was gradually discarded until completely retired in 1993.

Units 
The regiments and groups which used the equipment included:

 1st Army Corps
 3rd Artillery Regiment (1970–1990)
 4th Artillery Regiment (1976–1980)
 15th Artillery Regiment (1974–1990)
 2nd Army Corps
 32nd Artillery Regiment (1977–1993)
 74th Artillery Regiment (1975–1993)
 3rd Army Corps
 3rd Artillery Regiment (1990–1993)
 4th Artillery Regiment (1980–1993)
 Nuclear support regiments included:
 21st Maintenance Battalion
 22nd Maintenance Battalion

Operators

French Army

See also
The American MGM-52 Lance missile.

References

External links
 Pluton on astronautix.com

Bibliography

 CERMA Hors-série n7 (2013) Histoire de l'artillerie nucléaire de Terre française 1959-1996 ( // ISSN 1950-3547).

Cold War artillery of France
Nuclear artillery
Ballistic missiles of France
Military equipment introduced in the 1970s